Antizoma is a genus of flowering plants belonging to the family Menispermaceae.

Its native range is Angola to Southern Africa.

Species:

Antizoma angolensis 
Antizoma angustifolia 
Antizoma miersiana

References

Menispermaceae
Menispermaceae genera